The Ministry of Agrarian Policy and Food is the central executive authority of Ukraine in charge of country's agro-development. It is one of the oldest government agencies of Ukraine. On 29 August 2019 the ministry's function were taken over by the Ministry of Economic Development, Trade and Agriculture. On 17 December 2020 the ministry was resurrected.

Ministry activity is coordinated by the Cabinet of Ukraine. Ministry is the main authority in the system of central government responsible for  national agricultural policy supervising and implementation including policy on agriculture and food security, public policy in the fields of fishery and fishery protection, use and reproduction of aquatic resources, regulation of fishery and maritime security, veterinary medicine, species protection, land related questions, mapping and surveying, forestry and hunting, surveillance (monitoring) in agriculture.

History 

The precursor of the Ministry of Agrarian Policy and Food of Ukraine was the General Secretariat of Land Affairs, established on June 15, 1917 under the Government (the First Vynnychenko government) of the Central Council of Ukraine.

List of names of the precursor of the Ministry
 Ministry of Agriculture of the Ukrainian SSR
 Ministry of Fruits and Vegetables of the Ukrainian SSR
 Ministry of Rural Construction of the Ukrainian SSR
 Ministry of Meat and Milk Industry of the Ukrainian SSR
 Ministry of Food Industry of the Ukrainian SSR
 Ministry of Preparations of the Ukrainian SSR
 State Committee of the Ukrainian SSR on production and technical provision of agriculture
 Main Administration in gardening, viticulture and wine industry of the Ukrainian SSR
 State Agro-Industrial Committee of the Ukrainian SSR: 1986 - 1992 (part of the State Agro-Industrial Committee of the USSR)
 Kolhosps (along with the Council of kolhosps of the Ukrainian SSR)
 Ministry of Bread products of the Ukrainian SSR
 Ministry of Amelioration and Water Management of the Ukrainian SSR
 Ministry of Forestry of the Ukrainian SSR
 Ukrainian Administration in Fishing
 Ukoopspilka
 State Committee on Social Development of Village: 1991 - 1993
 State Committee on Bread products: 1991 - 1993
 Ministry of Agriculture and Food: 1992 - 1993
 Ministry of Agriculture and Food: 1993 - 1998
 Administrations of agriculture and food
 Administrations of agriculture and food in raion state administrations
 Inspections on preparations and quality of agriculture products of regional state administrations
 Inspections of state technical supervision on status of agricultural vehicles in regional state administrations
 State Committee on gardening, viticulture and wine industry: 1994 - 1998
 Ministry of Fishing: 1995 - 1997
 Ministry of Agro-Industrial Complex (APK): 1997 - 2000
 Committee of Food Industry
 Committee on gardening, viticulture and wine industry
 State Committee of Fishing: 1997 - 2000
 State Committee in monopoly on production and circulation of alcohol, alcoholic beverages, and tobacco products: 1998 - 2000
 Ministry of Agrarian Policy: 2000 - 2011
 Ukrainian State Concern in gardening, viticulture and wine industry: 2000–present

State Committee of Agro-Industrial Business
(As seen above) in 1985 the Ministry was transformed into the State Committee on Agrarian and Industrial Economy of Ukraine (Ukrainian Soviet Socialist Republic). The head of the committee was Yuriy Kolomiets who at the same time was the first deputy chairman of the council of ministers of the Ukrainian SSR. Oleksandr Tkachenko and Viktor Sytnyk were the first deputies of Kolomiets.

The State Committee (also known as Derzhahroprom) included number of other ministries and its regional branches.
 Ukrainian branch of the VASKhNIL
 Central administration on production and processing of plants
 Central administration of food industry
 Central administration on material and technical supply
 Central administration on human resources and external relations
 Central administration on fruit-vegetable economy and potatoes
 Central administration on production, preparation, and processing of products of animal husbandry
 Central administration on mechanization and electrification
 Central administration on capital construction project and reconstruction
 Forest Ministry
 Ministry of Amelioration and Water Management
 Ministry of Bread Products
 "Ukrholovrybhosp"
 Ukoopspilka
 Republican cooperative and state association on agrarian and industrial construction
 Republican of scientific and production association on agro-chemical servicing of agrarian business 
 NASU Institute of Economy
 Department of agrarian production management (Ukrainian science and research institute of economy and organization of agrarian business of Aleksandr Schlichter)
 representatives of the Central administration of statistics (deputy chief), the Ministry of Finance (first deputy),  the Derzhplan (first deputy director), the Derzhpostach (first deputy), the Ukrainian Office (Kontor) of Gosbank (deputy director)
 regional branches of all oblasts of Ukraine

2019—2020 disappearal of the Ministry
The on 29 August 2019 appointed Honcharuk Government did not have a separate Ministry of Agriculture. The Ministry function were taken over by the Ministry of Economic Development and Trade.

In January 2020 President Volodymyr Zelensky stated the need to separate the Ministry of Economic Development, Trade and Agriculture. Early March 2020 the Minister of Economic Development, Trade and Agriculture, Tymofiy Mylovanov refused to head a newly reestablish Ministry of Agriculture (because he did not agree with the economic policies of the new Shmyhal Government).

On 9 July 2020 Zelensky predicted that "at maximum in September" Ukraine would have a separate Minister of Agriculture again.

On 17 December 2020 the ministry was indeed resurrected with the appointment of Roman Leshchenko as Minister of Agricultural Policy and Food.

Structure

Subordinate authorities 

 State Veterinary and Phytosanitary Service of Ukraine
 State Agency of Land Resources of Ukraine
 State Agency for Forest Resources of Ukraine
 State Agency of Fisheries of Ukraine
 State Agriculture Inspectorate of Ukraine

Subdivisions 

 Office of the support service of the Minister
 Office of Inner Audit
 Department of Legal and Legislative Work
 Anti-Corruption Sector
 Department of Economic Development of Agricultural Market
 Department of financial and credit policy and accounting
 Department of Foreign Economic Relations
 Department of Agriculture
 Department of livestock
 Department of food
 Department for technical support and Agricultural Engineering
 Department of Public Information, interaction with the Cabinet of Ministers of Ukraine and consideration of appeals
 Department of Personnel
 Department of the Control
 Department of Science and Education of Agro-industry and Rural Development
 Department of communication with media, PR and Information
 Office of Management of State Property
 Operational-regime Office
 Sector of Safety and Fire Safety.

Ministry Commission 

 Committee on Rural Development
 Commission of the development of agricultural market of Ukraine
 Committee on Land Relations

Scientific institutions 

 Agricultural higher education institutions
 Research institutions
 Subordinated organization
 Other institutions of Ministry of Agrarian Policy and Food

Advisory structures 

As an advisory structure, under the Ministry acts a Public Council. Its activities are governed by the Regulations of the Public Council. Chairman of the Public Council is Leonid Kozachenko, president of the All-Ukrainian public organization "Ukrainian Agrarian Confederation".

List of Ministers

Ukrainian People's Republic

Land Cultivation

Food

Western Ukrainian People's Republic

Ukrainian People's Republic of Soviets

In March–April 1918 with the help of Central Powers, Ukraine was liberated from Bolsheviks.

Ukrainian Soviet Socialist Republic
The following list relates to institutions of the previously created by Bolsheviks Ukrainian People's Republic of Soviets.

Transitional period
On 21 May 1991 Oleksandr Tkachenko was appointed as a State Minister on issues of Agrarian Policy and Food – Minister of Agrarian (Rural) Business of Ukraine (until 24 August 1991 Ukrainian Soviet Socialist Republic).

Ukraine

See also
 Ukrainian production-technological support of agriculture
 Agrarian Fund
 Grain elevators companies
 Precision agriculture companies

Notes

References

External links 
 Official Website of Ukrainian Ministry of Agrarian Policy and Food
 Decree of the President of Ukraine № 1085/2010 (December 9, 2010) "About optimization of central authorities"

Agrarian Policy and Food
Agrarian Policy and Food
Ukraine
Ukraine
Food safety organizations
Regulation in Ukraine
Agricultural organizations based in Ukraine